Phellodon secretus is a rare species of tooth fungus in the family Bankeraceae. Described as new to science in 2003, it is found in Finland, where it grows under the fallen trunks of pine trees. It somewhat resembles Phellodon connatus, but has a thinner stipe, a softer, cotton-like cap, and smaller, rounder spores.

References

External links

Fungi described in 2003
Fungi of Europe
Inedible fungi
secretus